Sharovipterygidae is a family of strange gliding archosauromorphs from the mid-Triassic of Eurasia, notable for their short forelimbs and long, wing-like hindlimbs, which supported membranes for gliding. They are represented by Sharovipteryx and Ozimek volans.

A 2019 phylogenetic analysis suggested that Ozimek, and by extension Sharovipteryx, may belong to the Tanystropheidae.

References

Middle Triassic reptiles of Asia
Prehistoric archosauromorphs
Gliding animals
Late Triassic reptiles of Asia
Late Triassic reptiles of Europe
Prehistoric reptile families